Sam Richter is the creator and founder of the Know More sales and business improvement program and he delivers motivational keynote and workshop presentations on a variety of technology, sales, and marketing topics. He uses search engines like Google combined with social media including LinkedIn, Twitter, Facebook, and other Web-based resources as intelligence gathering and reputation management tools. As part of, and in addition to, his in-person programs, Richter teaches his innovative social selling and sales intelligence methodology via online programs.

Richter authored the book Take the Cold Out of Cold Calling about Sales Intelligence and finding information online and using it for business and sales success. The book has been featured by Harvey Mackay, on CNN, in BusinessWeek, and was named a USA Book News Winner, and a Sales Book Awards Silver Medalist.

Richter created the Sales Intel Engine, a collection of custom research tools that helps sales people discover new opportunities, identify decision makers and company employees, and research prospects and clients prior to sales calls or meetings. Among the custom engines are the Recruiting Search Engine, Find5500.ai, and YouGotHeroes, an Engine that makes it easy for companies to find, hire, and work with veterans. He also developed the YouGot family of sales, business, and competitive intelligence resources, which are free to anyone, at YouGotIntel.com. YouGotIntel includes YouGotTheNews, a newspaper search engine, YouGotResearch, a search engine providing access to research reports, survey results, industry outlooks, and industry data, YouGotLists, YouGotAssociations, YouGotSites, YouGotDocuments, and more.

Richter serves on the Boards of Directors for Brandpoint, a content marketing services and software company, and Argos Risk, a business financial risk insight firm. He serves on the Board of Directors for Mental Health Navigators, a non-profit online community for parents of children experiencing mental health issues, where Richter built the organization's mental health resource search engine.

Awards 
In 2017, Richter was inducted into the Minnesota Speakers Hall of Fame. In 2019, Top Sales World named Richter one of the world's top 50 Keynote Speakers, and in 2020, The Sweeney Agency Speakers Bureau named Richter one of the 15 Highest Rated Speakers for Virtual Events. In 2021, The Institute for Excellence in Sales named Richter Speaker of the Year. Inside View has multiple times named Richter as one of the Top 25 Most Influential People in Sales and Sales Insider of the Month. In 2003 Business Journal named Richter one of 40 top business leader under the age of 40, and he is also a past finalist for Inc. Magazine Entrepreneur of the Year.

In 2020, Richter was awarded the CPAE, the highest honor in the professional speaking business, and he was inducted into the Professional Speaker Hall of Fame.

History 
Richter received his Certified Speaking Professional designation in 2014 from the National Speakers Association. He also holds an advanced degree Certification in Executive Leadership from the University of St. Thomas and Boards of Director Certification from the University of St. Mary's/Caux Roundtable. He graduated from the University of Minnesota with a degree in journalism, and while there, he was a two-time Scholastic All-American and also a four-year player and letter winner on the University of Minnesota varsity football team.

Richter started his career at Fallon McElligott Rice advertising, now known as Fallon Worldwide. Then as an advertising writer and eventually creative director, Richter worked at numerous Twin Cities advertising agencies and eventually started his own firm which was later bought by a larger agency. He was then a group director at Weber Shandwick, a public relations firm, where he managed national marketing programs for Microsoft, Coca-Cola, Northwest Airlines, and Polaris. Following Shandwick, Richter worked at Digital River where he helped develop and market a software download program called eBot, and where he helped build the company's e-marketing agency serving clients including National Geographic, Major League Baseball, Nabisco, and Brunswick.

Following Digital River, for seven years, Richter was president of the James J. Hill Reference Library in St. Paul, Minnesota. Under Richter's direction, the Library developed numerous online programs and expanded its reach to serve an international audience.

Richter is a graduate of St. Louis Park High School in Minnesota. He is a judge of the Minnesota Cup Business Plan Competition. Richter was also an invited dignitary on the Minnesota Governor's trade mission to China.

Books
 Take the Cold Out of Cold Calling,

References

External links 

1967 births
American business writers
American marketing people
Business speakers
Living people
Writers from Minneapolis
University of Minnesota School of Journalism and Mass Communication alumni
Minnesota Golden Gophers football players